Events from the year 1652 in France

Incumbents
 Monarch – Louis XIV

Events
7 April – Battle of Bléneau

Births

24 January – Nicolas Chalon du Blé, general (died 1730)
14 February – Camille d'Hostun, duc de Tallard, nobleman, diplomat and military officer (died 1728)
9 April – Jean Le Fèvre, astronomer and physicist (died 1706)
21 April – Michel Rolle, mathematician, known for Rolle's theorem (died 1719)
9 November – Marie Anne d'Orléans, princess (died 1656)
Full date missing
Jean-Vincent d'Abbadie de Saint-Castin, military officer (died 1707)
Charles de Ferriol, ambassador (died 1722)

Deaths

13 March – Claude Bouthillier, statesman (born 1581)
13 April – Georges Fournier, Jesuit priest, geographer and mathematician (born 1595)
May – Claude de L'Estoile, playwright and poet (born 1602)
10 May – Jacques Buteux, Jesuit missionary in Canada, shot (born 1600)
10 August – Jean Gaston, Duke of Valois, prince (born 1650)
18 August – Florimond de Beaune, mathematician (born 1601)
November – Charles Fleury, lutenist, fell down a flight of stairs and apparently died in the arms of composer Johann Froberger (born c.1605)
Full date missing – Jacques Gaultier, lutenist (born c.1600)

See also

References

1650s in France